911: In Plane Site: Director's Cut is a 2004 documentary which promotes 9/11 conspiracy theories. Photographs and video footage from the September 11 attacks are presented and the documentary claims that the public was not given all of the facts surrounding the terrorist attack. It was directed by William Lewis.

Claims 
The films ask a series of leading questions about 9/11 conspiracy theories. Films such as In Plane Site and Loose Change only refer to the smaller hole on the second floor.

Reviews 

A short review in The Portland Mercury says of In Plane Site, "it features both an exceedingly annoying crackpot theorist and outlandish, unsubstantiated allegations about blurrily pixelized photos that don't really show anything".

Another review at Heraldextra.com states, "Nor does the presentation explain, if the attack planes were military, what happened to the commercial planes. It hints that they might have been shot down over the ocean. The trouble is that they weren't necessarily over the ocean. And who remembers an Atlantic crash of an airliner where debris such as luggage did not wash up all up and down the Eastern seaboard? If airliners went down in the sea, the secret could not have been kept for long.  It's fine to be entertained by this stuff, even if it is a bit morbid. But let's not lose our senses."  In the documentary von Kleist says the purpose of the documentary was not to provide explanations, but to raise questions:

You know, there are those that see these pictures and hear this information for the first time. They inevitably ask the question, "Well if the plane didn't hit the Pentagon, where did it go?" The answer is, I don't know where it went. For all I know, it could be sitting in 200 feet of water in the Atlantic Ocean. But then again, I didn't say that Flight 77 hit the Pentagon. That was [the mainstream media]. The question should be, if Flight 77 hit the Pentagon, then where is it?"

Television coverage 

 November 11, 2004 – Fox News played portions of the video while interviewing Jimmy Walter on the topic of alternate 9-11 theories.
 January 4, 2006 – Australian broadcast television station Channel Ten.
 September 9, 2006 – Broadcast on Australian television station Channel Ten. Broadcast resulted in complaints from MP Michael Danby.
 May 17, 2006 – CNN Headline News "Glenn Beck on Headline News" played portions while interviewing Dave von Kleist, the producer of the video.
 December 16, 2006 – TV3 in New Zealand airs the documentary.

See also 
 American Airlines Flight 11
 United Airlines Flight 175
 American Airlines Flight 77
 United Airlines Flight 93

References

External links 

  as archived by Wayback Machine May 21, 2013
 

2004 films
In Plane Site
Internet documentary films
In Plane Site
2004 documentary films
Documentary films about conspiracy theories
2000s English-language films